Corral is a town, commune and sea port in Valdivia Province, Los Ríos Region, Chile. It is located south of Corral Bay. Corral is best known for the forts of Corral Bay, a system of defensive batteries and forts made to protect Valdivia during colonial times. Corral was the headquarters of the system. Economic activities in Corral revolve around forestry, aquaculture, fishing, port services and both heritage and eco tourism.

The town is connected to Valdivia by a gravel road, to Caleta Chaihuín by an asphalted road and to Niebla on the other side of the bay by a ferry service.

History

The settlement of Corral grew out from the headquarters of the forts of Corral Bay that were built in 1645 to protect the city of Valdivia. By that time Spanish ships sailed through Valdivia River all the way to Valdivia but Corral soon took over the role of receiving major ships. Until 1749 the fort of Corral had no more than four cannons. Renewed interest in the defense of Valdivia led Juan Zermeño to design an expansion of the fort. This expansion and modernization was carried out from 1767 to 1773 when works halted to focus on the battery of Chorocamayo. The works were led by Juan Garland who made extensive modifications to Zermeño's plans. With the Spanish king's Decree of Free Trade of 1778 cities in Spanish America were allowed to have direct commerce with Spain, which greatly stimulated commerce in Corral that benefited from trade routes across Cape Horn. Indigenous Cuncos who were at war with Spanish had planned to attack Corral in 1770 and built for that reason a road from Punta Galera to the port, which the Spanish garrison dismantled.

The modern nucleus of Corral grew around the fort Castillo de Corral in the 1770s. By 1798 this settlement outside the fort had 49 inhabitants. During the Chilean Independence War Corral and Valdivia functioned together with Chiloé as a prominent royalist strongholds. In 1820 Thomas Cochrane, commanding the newly created Chilean Navy, took Corral and Valdivia by an amphibious attack. From the times of Chile's independence until the early 20th century Corral gained prominence as an important port for traffic between the Pacific and the Atlantic Ocean, as Chilean port were declared open to ships sailing under any state flag. After being incorporated into Chile the forts in Corral fell gradually into disuse. Since late colonial times Corral became not only the main port of entrance to the interior of Valdivia but also of Osorno that was founded in 1796.

Hydraulic sawmills were built in Corral in 1847–1848, various other hydraulic sawmills where established around Valdivia in the 1840s.

Decline

The economic activity of Corral suffered several setbacks in the 20th century that led it to become a minor port by international and Chilean standards. The Panama Canal opened in 1914, and Valdivia and Osorno became connected to central Chile by train in 1906 and 1905 respectively. This changed the trade and human traffic circuits in the region, resulting in Corral losing most of the international traffic that anchored there, but also of the Chilean goods and human traffic that was diverted by the railroads. In 1910 after a huge investment Altos Hornos y Acerías de Corral opened in Corral the largest steel mill at that time in South America. It produced high-cost pig iron using charcoal, and was labour-intensive. The steel mill proved to be an economical failure and was finally closed in 1958.

Corral was for a while an important whaling port. The outbreak of the First World War disrupted whaling as it was not possible to import supplies needed, but whaling resumed afterwards. Whaling in Chile declined dramatically in the 1960s and ended altogether in 1983. Remnants of whaling infrastructure are still visible on land.

The decline of Corral culminated with the 1960 Valdivia earthquake that destroyed houses, roads and port facilities. Currently (2015), there is only one pier and it is privately owned by a local company and used for shipping wood chips. The maximum permissible draught is 12.20 metres.

Demographics
Of these, 3,670 (67.2%) lived in urban areas and 1,793 (32.8%) in rural areas. The population fell by 5.2% (302 persons) between the 1992 and 2002 censuses.

Administration
As a commune, Corral is a third-level administrative division of Chile administered by a municipal council, headed by an alcalde who is directly elected every four years. The 2008–2012 alcalde is Gaston Peréz González (ILE).

Within the electoral divisions of Chile, Corral is represented in the Chamber of Deputies by Alfonso De Urresti (PS) and Roberto Delmastro (RN) as part of the 53rd electoral district, together with Valdivia, Lanco, Mariquina and Máfil.

See also
Altos Hornos y Acerías de Corral
Guape
Morro Gonzalo

Notes and references

Bibliography

External links

 Municipality of Corral

Communes of Chile
Populated places in Valdivia Province
Port settlements in Chile
Populated coastal places in Chile
Coasts of Los Ríos Region